The British People's Party, officially registered as the British People's Party - Unity, Equality, Freedom, was a short-lived British political party that was registered with the Electoral Commission and launched in December 2015. It ceased to exist in 2016.

Electoral performance
Ben Marshall, a member of the Pilsley Parish Council, joined the party the day after its launch to become its first councillor.

The party's first electoral contest was for a parish council by-election in Kintbury on 21 January 2016, winning 31 votes (8.2%).

The party unsuccessfully contested the North East Derbyshire District Council by-election in Tupton ward on 15 September 2016.

References

External links
 (defunct)

Political parties established in 2015
2015 establishments in England
Nationalist parties in the United Kingdom
Eurosceptic parties in the United Kingdom